Ernesto Saboia de Albuquerque Neto (born 1964, in Rio de Janeiro, Brazil) is a contemporary visual artist.

Early career
Ernesto Neto began exhibiting in Scotland in 1988 and has had solo exhibitions abroad since 1995. He represented with Vik Muniz their country in 2001 Venice Biennale, his installations were featured in Brazil's national pavilion and in the international group exhibition at the Arsenale.

Style

Neto's work has been described as "beyond abstract minimalism". His installations are large, soft, biomorphic sculptures that fill an exhibition space that viewers can touch, poke, and walk on or through. They are made of white, stretchy material—amorphous forms stuffed with Styrofoam pellets or, on occasion, aromatic spices. In some installations, he has also used this material to create translucent scrims that transform the space's walls and floor. His sculptures can be regarded as expression of traditional abstract form, but in their interaction with the viewer, they work on another level as well.

Exhibitions
One of his most acclaimed installation is at the Panthéon in Paris called Léviathan Thot.

In 2009 Neto exhibited a new work at New York's Park Avenue Armory called anthropodino. Filling the  hall, the aim is to help the Armory reposition itself as a big-art destination like the Turbine Hall in London's Tate Modern.

1994, 1997 Escola de Artes Visuais Parque Lage, Rio de Janeiro 
1994-96 Museu de Arte Moderna, Rio de Janeiro

In 1998, Neto exhibited a new installation Navedenga. A clear-like lycra chamber that stretched from the floor and ceiling, viewers were invited to remove their shoes and walk through it. Resembling penetrating an opening, this installation tries to connect the dependence of the viewer's experience and the work itself.

In 2010 he exhibited a popular display at London's Hayward Gallery called 'Edges of the World'.

In 2012 they exhibited "The tongue of Ernesto" at the College of San Ildefonso, Mexico
In 2015 Icastica Arezzo Italy

Neto has been awarded chevalier de L'Ordre des Arts et des Lettres.

In 2017, Neto exhibited at the Venice Biennale in the Arsenale.

In 2018, Neto exhibited at a central train station in Zurich, Switzerland. The exhibition was titled GaiaMotherTree and consisted largely of hand-knotted cotton strips in oranges and yellows. The exhibit was created alongside the Beyeler Foundation and featured a monthlong series of workshops for both children and adults which took place beneath the exhibit. At the time of its debut, Beyeler Foundation director Sam Keller estimated that approximately a half-million people will visit the station and, consequently, the sculpture. This would have made GaiaMotherTree the most visited work of art in the history of Switzerland.

In 2019, Neto exhibited at the Tanya Bonakdar Gallery with Children of the Earth in Los Angeles, California. This solo exhibit consisted of yellows, greens, purples, and reds. The exhibit also utilized musical instruments, spices and crystals to engage all five senses.

In 2021, Neto exhibited a new work at The Museum of Fine Arts, Houston called SunForceOceanLife. This solo exhibit featured large, spiraling hand-woven materials in oranges, yellows and greens.

References
Soares, Valeska; Meireles, Cildo; Neto, Ernesto. Seduções: Installations. Hatje; Daros. 2006

External links
 Flickr Search
  Google Images
 Fortes Vilaça
 Tanya Bonakdar Gallery
Astrup Fearnley Museum of Modern Art
Understanding the Expansion of Universe: An interview with Ernesto Neto at Studio International

1964 births
Living people
Brazilian contemporary artists
People from Rio de Janeiro (city)